Joana Castelão is a Portuguese female sport shooter. At the 2012 Summer Olympics, she competed in the Women's 10 metre air pistol and the women's 25 metre pistol.

References

Portuguese female sport shooters
Living people
Olympic shooters of Portugal
Shooters at the 2012 Summer Olympics
1984 births
Shooters at the 2015 European Games
European Games competitors for Portugal
Shooters at the 2019 European Games
Sportspeople from Lisbon District